The Bangladesh cricket team toured England, playing three One Day Internationals and two Test matches between 27 May and 12 July 2010.

Test series

1st Test

2nd Test

ODI series

1st ODI

2nd ODI

3rd ODI

Tour matches

First-class: Surrey vs Bangladeshis

First-class: Bangladeshis vs Essex

First-class: Bangladeshis vs England Lions

List A: Sussex vs Bangladeshis

List A: Middlesex vs Bangladeshis

2010 in English cricket
2010
International cricket competitions in 2010